{{Infobox person
| name          = Vikraman
| image         = Vikraman at Koditta Idangalai Nirappuga Audio Launch and Felicitation to K Bhagyaraj.jpg
| alt           = 
| caption       = Vikraman at Koditta Idangalai Nirappugas audio launch in 2016
| birth_date    = 
| birth_place   = Panpoli, Tenkasi, Tamil Nadu, India
| nationality   = 
| occupation    = Film director
| years_active  = 1990–present
| spouse        = Jayapriya
| children      = Kanishka, Pooja
}}Vikraman''' is an Indian film director primarily working in Tamil cinema. 

Career
1990–1994
He worked as an assistant to actor and director R. Parthiban in Puthiya Pathai (1989), which was the latter's debut film as a director and an actor. Vikraman made his directorial debut with the film Pudhu Vasantham (1990) produced by R. B. Choudary, for which director K. S. Ravikumar apprenticed under him as an assistant director. The film was about four unemployed friends and musical experts who find themselves unexpectedly saddled with a young woman. Upon release, the film received critical acclaim and it re-wrote Tamil cinema history, sparking a whole range of "friendship" films. Its hero Murali went on to become a romantic actor in subsequent films. His second film Perum Pulli (1991) received negative reviews with N. Krishnaswamy of The Indian Express stating, "Directed by Vikraman who made Pudhu Vasantham and made name for himself [..] Perum Pulli has a hash of a story" and it bombed at the box-office. His next two films Naan Pesa Ninaipathellam (1993) and Gokulam (1993) received mixed  reception. In 1994, his venture Pudhiya Mannargal starring Vikram and with music composed by A. R. Rahman flopped at the box-office despite a revolutionary theme of students and politics. A critic wrote, "Nothing much in this movie but a controversial idea".

1996–2002
Vikraman was recalled once again by R. B. Choudary to make a film with Vijay titled Poove Unakkaga in 1996. It was the first breakthrough in the young actor's career. His next film Suryavamsam (1997) with Sarath Kumar and Devayani was a major success. Unnidathil Ennai Koduthen made in 1998 gave a fresh lease of life to Karthik and Roja who were once dominating the film industry. While Ajith Kumar impresses in a rather lengthy cameo. In 2000, he made a film Vanathai Pola with an ensemble cast, another blockbuster which gave back the superstardom to Vijayakanth. It also won the National Film Award for Best Popular Film Providing Wholesome Entertainment in 2001 and also many state awards. He then began pre-production work in 2000 for a film starring Surya and Laila and the said project Unnai Ninaithu (2002) did well.

2003–2014
His next film Priyamaana Thozhi (2003) produced by the AVM Productions was a hit again. Its simultaneously shot Telugu version, Vasantham in (helmed by himself) was one of the top grossers of 2003. But he had to face another dud in 2004 in Cheppave Chirugali, a Telugu remake of his hit Tamil film starring Suriya and Sneha, Unnai Ninaithu. Taking a two-year break, he had started work again for a Tamil film called Chennai Kadhal (2006) with Bharath in the lead. However, the film was unsuccessful at the box office. He made a comeback with Mariyadhai in 2009, another Tamil film starring Vijayakanth, Meena, Meera Jasmine and Ambika playing the lead roles. His latest film Ninaithathu Yaaro featuring newcomers released in January 2014.
Others
Vikraman has been elected as the new president of the Tamil Nadu Film Directors Association (TANTIS) replacing Bharathiraja after he defeated fellow director Visu in the election.Vikraman wins Director's Union election! – The Times of India
Filmography
DirectorAll films are in Tamil, unless otherwise noted.Lyricist

ActorObama Ungalukkaaga'' (2021)

References

Tamil film directors
Film directors from Tamil Nadu
Living people
Tamil Nadu State Film Awards winners
Filmfare Awards South winners
Telugu film directors
20th-century Indian film directors
21st-century Indian film directors
People from Tirunelveli district
1964 births
Directors who won the Best Popular Film Providing Wholesome Entertainment National Film Award